Rudie is an abbreviation for the name Rudolph. It may also refer to:

People with given name
Rudie Dane, competitor on The Bachelorette (season 10)
Rudie Hermann Kuiter (born 1943), Australian underwater photographer
Rudie Kemna (born 1967), Dutch cyclist
Rudie Liebrechts (born 1941), Dutch speed skater
Rudie Lubbers (born 1945), Dutch boxer
Rudie Ramli (born 1982), Malaysian footballer
Rudie Sypkes (1950–2008), Australian businessman
Rudie van Vuuren, Namibian physician, conservationist and sportsman

People with surname
Evelyn Rudie (born 1949), American playwright and actress
Karen Rudie (born 1963), Canadian electrical engineer

Fictional characters
Rudie, band manager in animated children's television series Kuu Kuu Harajuku

Slang and popular culture
Rudie, synonym of rude boy, Jamaican and UK youth subculture
Rudie blues, music genre that was a precursor to reggae and ska
Rudie Can't Fail, reggae-influenced song about rude boys by the Clash
General Rudie, Canadian ska band